Regina West was a federal electoral district in Saskatchewan, Canada, that was represented in the House of Commons of Canada from 1979 to 1988.

This riding was created in 1976 from parts of Regina—Lake Centre riding. It consisted of the part of the City of Regina lying west of Albert Street, and adjacent rural areas and Indian Reserves.

It was abolished in 1987 when it was redistributed into Regina—Lumsden and Regina—Wascana ridings.  The representative was Les Benjamin.

Election results

See also 

 List of Canadian federal electoral districts
 Past Canadian electoral districts

External links 

Former federal electoral districts of Saskatchewan